The Sin of Being a Woman (Spanish: El pecado de ser mujer) is a 1955 Mexican drama film directed by Zacarías Gómez Urquiza and starring Tito Guízar and Alma Rosa Aguirre. The film's sets were designed by art director Javier Torres Torija.

Plot
Javier Morales (Tito Guízar) is a singer-songwriter who seduces a young woman, María Luisa (Alma Rosa Aguirre), who he gets pregnant and then abandons. Twenty years later, Javier falls into poverty. After he's mistakenly declared dead, he ends up going to his own funeral, without knowing that he is going to face his own past.

Cast
Tito Guízar as Javier Morales
Alma Rosa Aguirre as María Luisa Aguirre
Ricardo Román as Javier Aguirre
Armando Velasco as Señor Romero
Emilio Brillas as Fernando
Roberto G. Rivera as Radio show announcer
Carlos Bravo y Fernández as Costume party guest
Ángel Merino as Carlos Patiño
Estela Matute as Felisa Dieguez, reporter
Tito Guízar hijo as Javier Aguirre (child)
Daniel Arroyo as Man in airport (uncredited)
León Barroso as Theater employee (uncredited)
Victorio Blanco as Costume party guest (uncredited)
Guillermo Bravo Sosa as Beggar run over (uncredited)
Javier de la Parra as Reporter (uncredited)
Enedina Díaz de León as Landlady (uncredited)
Leonor Gómez as Puestera (uncredited)
Ana María Hernández as Theater viewer (uncredited)
Salvador Lozano as Dr. Enrique Ruiz (uncredited)
Chel López as Taxi driver (uncredited)
Rubén Márquez as Costume party guest (uncredited)
Óscar Ortiz de Pinedo as Reporter (uncredited)
Alberto Pedret as Costume party announcer (uncredited)
Carlos Robles Gil as Theater viewer (uncredited)
Joaquín Roche as Theater viewer (uncredited)
Manuel Sánchez Navarro as Man at funeral (uncredited)
Christa von Humboldt as Javier's mistress (uncredited)

References

Bibliography
Amador, María Luisa. Cartelera cinematográfica, 1950–1959. UNAM, 1985.
García Riera, Emilio. Historia documental del cine mexicano: 1952. Ediciones Era, 1969.
Alcerreca, Rafael. Un regard sur les studios churubusco. Estudios Churubusco Azteca, 2002.

External links

1955 films
1955 drama films
Mexican drama films
Films directed by Zacarías Gómez Urquiza
Mexican black-and-white films
1950s Mexican films
1950s Spanish-language films